Under the Yoke is a 1918 American silent drama film directed by J. Gordon Edwards and starring Theda Bara. It is based on the short story "Maria of the Roses" by George Scarborough. Under the Yoke is now considered to be a lost film.

Plot
As described in a film magazine, when Maria Valverda (Bara) refuses the attentions of Diablo Ramirez (Nye), he starts an insurrection among the native Filipinos. Maria's father Don Ramon is killed and Maria is held hostage. She gets word to Capt. Paul Winter (Roscoe) of the American troops in Manila and he comes to her assistance, but his troops are outnumbered and they are made prisoners by the revolting revolutionists. Maria and Paul attempt to escape, but they are caught and brought back. At the Manila headquarters, trouble is suspected and reinforcements are sent. Before long, the revolt is subdued and peace reigns over Maria's home, and happiness over the betrothal of Maria and Paul.

Historical background

As noted by researcher Nathan Bradford, "At the time when 'Under The Yoke' was made, American policy towards the Philippines consisted of a promise to grant independence at some unspecified future time, when Filipinos would be 'ready', grants of a limited amount of autonomy, and a firm resolve to maintain US rule 'for the time being'. Well within living memory - in fact, just sixteen years before the film was made - the US used considerable force to put down those Filipinos impertinent enough to seek independence in the here and now. The film, made for the general American public, naturally reflects this narrative: beautiful Filipina damsel in distress  threatened by the literally diabolic Filipino rebel; chivalrous American officer comes to the rescue; eventually, the revolt is crushed, American rule reinforced, Filipina and American officer get married, Happy End".

Cast
 Theda Bara as Maria Valverda
 G. Raymond Nye as Diablo Ramirez
 Albert Roscoe as Capt. Paul Winter 
 Edwin B. Tilton as Don Ramon Valverde
 Carrie Clark Ward as Duenna

Reception

Like many American films of the time, Under the Yoke was subject to restrictions and cuts by city and state film censorship boards. For example, the Chicago Board of Censors cut, in Reel 3, the execution of Don Ramon, Reel 4, scene between Maria and Diablo where he kisses her on the shoulder, and required three scenes of torturing an American soldier be shortened.

See also
List of lost films
1937 Fox vault fire

References

External links

1918 films
1918 lost films
1918 drama films
Fox Film films
Silent American drama films
American silent feature films
American black-and-white films
Films based on short fiction
Films directed by J. Gordon Edwards
Films shot in California
Lost American films
Films set in the Philippines
Lost drama films
1910s American films